The year 1779 in architecture involved some significant events.

Buildings and structures

Buildings

 St Paul's Square, Birmingham, England.
 South façade of Stowe House, England, completed in the neoclassical style based on a design by Robert Adam.
 Robert Adam completes his remodelling of Kenwood House on Hampstead Heath, London.
 New Church of Ireland Christ Church Cathedral, Waterford, designed by John Roberts, completed.
 Fridericianum in Kassel (Hesse), designed by Simon Louis du Ry, completed.
 Royal Saltworks at Arc-et-Senans, designed by Claude Nicolas Ledoux, completed.
 The Piece Hall in Halifax, West Yorkshire, opened 1 January 1779, Grade 1 listed Cloth Hall.

Awards
 Grand Prix de Rome, architecture: Guy de Gisors and Père François Jacques Lannoy.

Births
 April 10 – James Savage, English architect (died 1852)
 July 8 – Giorgio Pullicino, Maltese painter and architect (died 1851)
 Edward Lapidge, English architect (died 1860)

Deaths
 September 30 – Johan Christian Conradi, German-Danish master builder and architect (born 1709)
 November 9 – Carl Johan Cronstedt, Swedish architect and inventor (born 1709)
 Giuseppe Bonici, Maltese architect and military engineer (born 1707)
 Thomas Ivory, English builder and architect working in Norwich (born 1709)
 Richard Taliaferro, American architect working in Williamsburg, Virginia (born c.1705)

References 

Architecture
Years in architecture
18th-century architecture